V. Vasanthi Devi (born 1938) is an Indian educationist and acclaimed academic. She is the president of the Association for India's Development and a trustee of the Madras Institute of Development Studies. Devi served as the vice-chancellor of the Manonmaniam Sundaranar University between 1992–1998 and as the chairperson of the State Commission for Women in Tamil Nadu between 2002 and 2005.

Biography 
Vasanthi Devi was born in 1938 in Dindigul, Madras Presidency to P V Das who was a municipal chairman. At the age of 15, she moved to the city of Madras and enrolled in the Queen Mary's College, Chennai to complete her higher secondary education. She graduated from Presidency College, Chennai with a Master of Arts in history. Subsequently, she went to the Philippines in the 1970s for a PhD in domestic political groupings and dynamics and graduated with the doctorate at the University of the Philippines in 1980.

She became a professor at the Queen Mary's College and is noted to have led the 1987 college teacher's strike in Tamil Nadu. She was appointed as the principal of the Government College for Women, Kumbakonam between 1988 and 1990. Between 1992 and 1998, she was appointed as the vice-chancellor of the Manonmaniam Sundaranar University and later made the chairperson of the State Commission for Women in Tamil Nadu between 2002 and 2005.

References

Living people
1939 births
Academic staff of Manonmaniam Sundaranar University